Osterman is a surname. Notable people with the surname include:

Russian
 Andrei Osterman (1686–1747), Russian statesman
 Ivan Osterman (1725-1811), Russian statesman

American
 Cat Osterman (b. 1983), American softball player
 Harry Osterman, Chicago politician
 Kathryn Osterman (1883-1956), American actress
 Lynne Osterman (b. 1962), American politician from Minnesota
 J.P. Osterman, American writer of science fiction

Slovene
 Ana Osterman (born 1940), Slovene politician

Fictional characters
 Jon Osterman, a character in the Watchmen series, known more commonly as Doctor Manhattan

See also
 The Osterman Weekend, a novel
 The Osterman Weekend (film)
 Ostermann
 Eastman (surname)